

Individual women who won eight or more medals

World Artistic Gymnastics Championships

The years listed for each gymnast only include World Championships where they won medals. American gymnast Simone Biles holds the record for the most World Championship medals (25), as well as the most gold medals (19) in World Championship history for an athlete of either sex.

Individual women who won medals in every event

This section lists the female Artistic Gymnasts who have won at least one medal in every event (team final, all-around, Vault, Uneven Bars, Balance Beam, and Floor Exercise) at the World Artistic Gymnastics Championships. The years listed refer to the World Championships at which the gymnast won her first medal in the event; the dates of any subsequent medals she may have won in the same event are not
The Soviet gymnast Larisa Latynina was the first and so far the only gymnast to have been World Champion in every event. Larisa Latynina and Věra Čáslavská have been a World Champion or Olympic Champion in every event. Lavinia Milosovici  is the last gymnast to have been a World Champion or Olympic Champion in every event final.

Listed separately are the gymnasts who have at some point in their career won medals in every event either in the World Championships or in the Olympic Games; gymnasts who have won medals in all six events at the same World Championships; and the gymnasts who have won medals in all six events at the same Olympic Games.

Medaled in every event over their career

Medaled in every event at a single edition

See also

List of Olympic medal leaders in women's gymnastics
List of female artistic gymnasts with the most appearances at Olympic Games

References 

World Artistic
Lists of medalists in gymnastics